The 2003 Churchill Cup was held between 14 June and 28 June 2003 in Vancouver, British Columbia, Canada. It was the inaugural year of the Churchill Cup. Three rugby union teams took part in the men's competition: Canada, England A and the USA.

A women's event involving the same teams also formed part of the event. This article concerns the men's event.

Format

The teams played each other once in a round robin format, before the top two teams played in the Churchill Cup final.

Results

Round-robin results

2003 Churchill Cup Final

See also
 Churchill Cup
 Women's Churchill Cup 2003

References

External links
 Churchill Cup official site

2003
2003 rugby union tournaments for national teams
International rugby union competitions hosted by Canada
2002–03 in English rugby union
2003 in Canadian rugby union
2003 in American rugby union